Adri is a given name and nickname which may refer to:

 Adri (Adrienne Steckling-Coen) (1934-2006), American fashion designer
 Adrià Adri Arnaus (born 1994), Spanish golfer
 Adrián Adri Castellano (born 1994), Spanish footballer
 Adrián Adri Cuevas (born 1990), Spanish footballer
 Adriaan Adri Dees (1942–2021), Dutch politician
 Adri Duycker (born 1946), Dutch retired cyclist
 Adrián Adri Embarba (born 1992), Spanish footballer
 Adrianus Adri van Es (1913–1994), Dutch vice admiral
 Adrian Adri Geldenhuys (born 1964), South African former rugby union player
 Adrián Adri Gómez (born 1994), Spanish footballer
 Adri van Heteren (born 1951), Dutch Christian Reformed Churches minister and politician
 Adriaan Adri van Houwelingen (born 1953), Dutch retired road bicycle racer
 Adrianus Adri van Male (1910–1990), Dutch football goalkeeper
 Adrián Adri Montoro (born 1995), Spanish footballer
 Adriana Adri Bleuland van Oordt (1862–1944), Dutch artist and draftswoman
 Adrián Adri Pavón (born 1989), Spanish footballer
 Adrie Adri van der Poel (born 1959), Dutch retired cyclist
 Adrián Adri Rodrígues (born 1988), Andorran footballer
 Adrián Adri Ruiz (born 1988), Spanish footballer
 Adri Schoeman (born 1970), South African retired sprinter
 Adrianus Adri van Tiggelen (born 1957), Dutch retired footballer
 Adri van Westerop (1957–2009), Luxembourg politician, author and scientist
 Adri van der Merwe (born 2002), Namibian cricketer

Spanish-language hypocorisms
Lists of people by nickname